There are two state-controlled roads linking  and  in the Toowoomba region of Queensland, Australia. They are Millmerran–Cecil Plains Road, which runs to the west of the Condamine River, and Pampas–Horrane Road, which runs east of the river.

Road west
Millmerran–Cecil Plains Road is a continuous  road route. It is a regional road (number 3251).

Route description west
The Millmerran–Cecil Plains Road commences at an intersection with the Gore Highway (A39) in the  CBD. It turns north-east as it approaches the Cecil Plains CBD, passing the exit to Cecil Plains–Moonie Road. It enters the CBD as Taylor Street, ending at an intersection with Dalby–Cecil Plains Road and Toowoomba–Cecil Plains Road (State Route 82). Land use along this road is mainly crop farming.

Road east

Pampas–Horrane Road is a continuous  road route, signed as State Route 82. It is a district road (number 327), rated as a local road of regional significance (LRRS).

Route description east
Land use along this road is mainly crop farming.

State Route 82
It is not necessarily the best or the shortest or the quickest route between the two terminii. It was proclaimed as a State Route because, at the time, it was the most convenient route for many users. It is also an example of why motorists in unfamiliar territory should follow a designated route rather than rely on a vehicle navigation system, which may direct them onto less suitable alternative roads.

Here the Chinchilla–Wondai Road turns west, while State Route 82 continues south on Jandowae  Connection Road to Jandowae. In Jandowae the road name changes to Dalby–Jandowae Road, which continues to the Warrego Highway in the west of Dalby. From there it follows the Warrego Highway to the south-east until it reaches Dalby–Cecil Plains Road, where it continues south.

At a T-junction in Cecil Plains, State Route 82 turns east on Toowoomba–Cecil Plains Road until it reaches Pampas–Horrane Road, where it turns south. Note that many navigation systems will suggest a turn to the west in Cecil Plains, leading to Millmerran–Cecil Plains Road. From there it follows the Gore Highway south-west to Millmerran, where it turns south on the Millmerran–Inglewood Road.

History

Yandilla pastoral run was established in 1842. In 1881 part of Yandilla was selected for the town of Millmerran. The town developed quickly as the commercial centre for the district.

West of the river Kurrowah station was resumed from Yandilla in 1870 and opened for selection. Also in the west, Lemontree pastoral run was established as part of Yandilla in 1841, and in 1887 was opened for settlement. 

Cecil Plains pastoral run was established in 1842. In 1877  was resumed from the Cecil Plains pastoral run to establish smaller farms. This resumption soon led to closer settlement and a demand for better roads to enable the commercial success of the new farms. Some of this settlement occurred to the east of the river.

A postal receiving office opened in Cecil Plains in 1890, and the first school in 1898. Over time the areas along the two lines of road from Millmerran to Cecil Plains were settled as farms of various sizes. In 1916, Cecil Plains station was acquired by the Queensland government and subdivided for closer settlement, with some parcels reserved for soldier settlers. The new settlers produced mainly wheat and dairy.

A reliable road connection from Millmerran to Dalby, which was the closest railhead until 1919, was needed to provide access to markets and larger items of equipment.

Major intersections west
All distances are from Google Maps. The entire road is in the Toowoomba local government area.

Major intersections east
All distances are from Google Maps. The entire road is in the Toowoomba local government area.

See also

 List of road routes in Queensland
 List of numbered roads in Queensland

Notes

References

Roads in Queensland